Bez Udania Dôvodu is the fifth album by the Slovak punk rock band Iné Kafe, released in 2003.

Track listing

Personnel
 Vratko Rohoň - vocals, guitar
 Peter "Forus" Fóra - bass, backing vocals
 Jano Rozbora – drums

References

2003 albums
Iné Kafe albums